Airport South is a metro station on the Orange (North-South) line of the Nagpur Metro serving the Somalwada area of Nagpur. It was opened to the public on 8 March 2019.

The Nagpur Metro Rail Corporation Limited (now the Maharashtra Metro Rail Corporation Limited) awarded the contract to construct the station to Infrastructure Leasing & Financial Services (ILFS) in July 2016. Construction of the outer structure of the station was completed by November 2017, and interior work began in the same month.  The station was awarded a platinum rating by the Indian Green Building Council, the highest rating the Council presents for sustainable construction practices that reduce environmental impact.

Mahametro began installing solar panels at the station on 4 June 2018. Construction of the station was completed by January 2019.

Design
The Airport South station has a steel sheet roof and features primarily glass walls inspired by a green theme. Solar panels of 110 KW fitted on the station's roof supply around 65% of the total electricity required by the station. The station's upper floor houses a large hall which can be utilized to host conventions, weddings and other events.

Airport South is the first metro station in India to implement the Bio-digester technology. The Bio-digester, a sewage treatment system, was developed by the Defence Research and Development Organization (DRDO) and dedicated to the Swachh Bharat Abhiyan. The station is also equipped with a rainwater harvesting system. Two pits of 2.1-metre diameter each collect about 80% of the total runoff water to be harvested.

Station Layout

References

Nagpur Metro stations
Railway stations in India opened in 2019